Homalometa is a genus of long-jawed orb-weavers that was first described by Eugène Louis Simon in 1898.  it contains three species, found in the Caribbean, Panama, Costa Rica, Brazil, and Mexico: H. chiriqui, H. nigritarsis, and H. nossa.

See also
 List of Tetragnathidae species

References

Araneomorphae genera
Spiders of Brazil
Spiders of North America
Tetragnathidae